Arnaldo Antonio Sanabria Ayala (born 4 March 1996), also known as Tonny Sanabria, is a Paraguayan professional footballer who plays as a forward for Serie A club Torino and the Paraguay national team.

Club career

Barcelona
Born in San Lorenzo, Paraguay, Sanabria started his career in futsal, later moving to football. He joined Cerro Porteño's youth academy in 2004. In 2007, he and his parents moved to Spain, and he joined a local club from Sitges, called La Blanca Subur CF.

Sanabria joined FC Barcelona's youth academy in 2009, aged 13. A year later, he moved to La Masia's facilities. In September 2012, still a youth, he was called up by manager Tito Vilanova to train with first team.

In August 2013, Sanabria was promoted to FC Barcelona B in Segunda División. On 29 September he made his professional debut, playing the last 22 minutes in a 0–1 home loss against RCD Mallorca.

On 20 November 2013, Sanabria rejected a contract extension from Barça. Three days later he scored his first professional goal, in a 1–2 home loss against UD Las Palmas. He was linked to Roma and others which faced fierce competition to sign him in January.

Sassuolo
On 29 January 2014, Sanabria joined fellow Serie A side Sassuolo, for a €4.5 million fee, plus €7.5 million bonuses "dependent on the player’s performance and his future value". The deal was later clarified and he would join Roma in July, as the Giallorossi already reached the foreign quota.

Sanabria made his Serie A debut on 23 March, replacing Davide Biondini in a 0–1 loss at Udinese.

Roma
Sanabria officially joined Roma in July 2014 for €4.926 million (including €2.5 million from Roma via Sassuolo to Barcelona). Roma also took the contractual responsibility from Sassuolo, to pay Barcelona up to an additional €7 million for bonuses. As well as being a member of the first team squad, Sanabria also featured for the Roma Primavera squad in the 2014–15 UEFA Youth League, scoring two goals in the 3–2 defeat against Bayern Munich on 5 November 2014.

On 8 February 2015, Sanabria made his first team debut for Roma, replacing Francesco Totti after 62 minutes, in the 2–1 Serie A victory against Cagliari.

Sporting de Gijón (loan)
On 11 August he returned to Spain, after agreeing to a one-year loan deal with La Liga side Sporting de Gijón. Sanabria made his La Liga debut on 23 August 2015, starting in a 0–0 home draw against Real Madrid. He scored his first goals in the category on 23 September, netting a brace in a 3–2 away win against Deportivo de La Coruña.

Sanabria scored a hat-trick in a 3–1 home success over UD Las Palmas on 6 December 2015. He added another on 22 January of the following year, in a 5–1 routing of Real Sociedad.

Betis
On 15 July 2016, Sanabria signed a five-year deal with Real Betis for a fee of €7.5 million, with Roma retaining a 50% clause on the following transfer and a re-buy clause.

On 20 September 2017 he scored the winning goal in Real Betis' 1–0 win over Real Madrid. It was Betis' first win at the Bernabeu since October 1998, when Finidi George scored in another 1–0 victory.

Genoa
On 26 January 2019, Sanabria signed for Serie A club Genoa on loan until 30 June 2020.

Torino
On 31 January 2021, Sanabria signed a four-year contract with Torino in the Serie A.

International career
Sanabria played for both the under-17 and under-20 Paraguay teams.

In 2013, Sanabria was called up to the Paraguay national team for two qualification matches for the 2014 FIFA World Cup, against Bolivia and Argentina to make an official appearance for the national team, in the case that Spain wanted to nationalize him.

He made his full squad debut on 14 August 2013, in a 3–3 draw against Germany.  Sanabria was selected as part of Paraguay's Copa America Centenario squad, where he made two appearances.  He came on as a substitute in the second group stage match against Colombia, as well as started in the final group stage match against the United States.

Career statistics

Club

International

Scores and results list Paraguay's goal tally first.

Honours

Club
Barcelona
 UEFA Youth League: 2013–14

References

External links

FC Barcelona official profile 

1996 births
Living people
People from San Lorenzo, Paraguay
Paraguayan footballers
Association football forwards
La Liga players
Segunda División players
FC Barcelona Atlètic players
Sporting de Gijón players
Real Betis players
Serie A players
U.S. Sassuolo Calcio players
A.S. Roma players
Genoa C.F.C. players
Torino F.C. players
Paraguayan expatriate footballers
Expatriate footballers in Spain
Paraguayan expatriate sportspeople in Spain
Expatriate footballers in Italy
Paraguayan expatriate sportspeople in Italy
Paraguay under-20 international footballers
Paraguay international footballers
2015 South American Youth Football Championship players
Copa América Centenario players